The Eagles women's cricket team is a Zimbabwean women's cricket team based in Harare. They compete in the Fifty50 Challenge and the Women's T20 Cup. They won the first two editions of the Women's T20 Cup in 2020–21 and 2021–22, and the second edition of the Fifty50 Challenge in 2021–22.

History
The team were formed in 2020, to compete in Zimbabwe's two new women's domestic competitions: the Fifty50 Challenge and the Women's T20 Cup. In the Fifty50 Challenge, the side finished third in the group stage, winning three of their six matches. In the Women's T20 Cup, the side topped the group with four wins from their six matches to qualify for the final. In the final, they restricted Tuskers to 78 from their 20 overs, before chasing the target in 14.1 overs to win the inaugural Women's T20 Cup. Eagles captain Modester Mupachikwa was the leading run-scorer in the competition, whilst Eagles bowler Precious Marange was the leading wicket-taker.

In 2021–22, they won their first one-day title, topping the group stage of the Fifty50 Challenge before beating Rhinos in the final by 167 runs. Eagles bowler Michelle Mavunga was the leading wicket-taker in the competition, with 15 wickets. They then won the T20 Cup the same season, topping the group stage with four wins before beating Mountaineers in the final by 7 wickets. Mavunga was once again the leading wicket-taker in the tournament, whilst Eagles player Kelis Ndlovu was the leading run-scorer.

Players

Current squad
Based on appearances in the 2021–22 season. Players in bold have international caps.

Seasons

Fifty50 Challenge

Women's T20 Cup

Honours
 Fifty50 Challenge:
 Winners (1): 2021–22
 Women's T20 Cup:
 Winners (1): 2020–21 & 2021–22

See also
 Mashonaland Eagles

References

Women's cricket teams in Zimbabwe
Cricket in Mashonaland